Ray Gun was an American alternative rock-and-roll magazine, first published in 1992 in Santa Monica, California. Led by founding publisher Marvin Scott Jarrett, art director David Carson and executive editor Randy Bookasta, along with founding editor Neil Feineman, Ray Gun explored experimental magazine typographic design and unique angles on the pop cultural currents of the 1990s. The editorial content was framed in a chaotic, abstract "grunge typography" style, not always readable (it once published an interview with Bryan Ferry entirely in the symbol font Zapf Dingbats), but distinctive in appearance. That visual tradition continued even after Carson left the magazine after three years; he was followed by a series of art directors, including Robert Hales, Chris Ashworth, Jason Saunby, Scott Denton-Cardew, and Jerome Curchod.

In terms of content, Ray Gun was also notable for its choices of subject matter. The advertising, musical artists and pop culture icons spotlighted were progressive—for example putting such artists as Radiohead, Björk, Beck, Flaming Lips, PJ Harvey and Eminem on its cover before its competitors. Those choices were guided by Executive Editor Randy Bookasta (and founding editor Neil Feineman for the first three issues), along with an editorial staff that included Dean Kuipers, Nina Malkin, Mark Blackwell, Joe Donnelly, Grant Alden, Mark Woodlief, Eric Gladstone and photographer Ian Davies.

Ray Gun produced over 70 issues from 1992 through 2000. Owner-founder-publisher Marvin Scott Jarrett (one-time publisher of a late-1980s incarnation of Creem) also later created the magazines Stick, huH, Bikini, and Nylon  (a New York–based fashion magazine). The most notable common thread among all of Jarrett's magazines (from his days at Creem through Nylon) have been their focus on graphic design and music.

Partial list of issues

See also
 Emigre (magazine)
 The Face (magazine)
 Print (magazine)

Books
Ray Gun: Out of Control by Dean Kuipers and Marvin Scott Jarrett, Simon & Schuster (1997), . Design and art direction by Neil Fletcher and Chris Ashworth.
Ray Gun: The Bible of Music and Style by Marvin Scott Jarrett, with Contributions from Steven Heller (design writer), Liz Phair, Wayne Coyne, Ian Davies and Dean Kuipers, Rizzoli (2019), .

Notes

External links
 “Magical Mystery Tour”, by Neva Chonin, Ray Gun, May 1998.

Defunct magazines published in the United States
Magazines disestablished in 2000
Magazines established in 1992
Magazines published in California
Music magazines published in the United States